Jimmy Baxter (born November 30, 1980)  is an American-Jordanian professional basketball player who previously played for Ilisiakos B.C. in Greece and played for various other teams since then.

On January 20, 2016, Baxter signed with Toros de Aragua of the Venezuelan League.

References 

1980 births
Living people
American expatriate basketball people in Argentina
American expatriate basketball people in Belgium
American expatriate basketball people in Brazil
American expatriate basketball people in Chile
American expatriate basketball people in France
American expatriate basketball people in Germany
American expatriate basketball people in Greece
American expatriate basketball people in Iran
American expatriate basketball people in Israel
American expatriate basketball people in Italy
American expatriate basketball people in Latvia
American expatriate basketball people in Portugal
American expatriate basketball people in Slovenia
American expatriate basketball people in Turkey
American expatriate basketball people in Venezuela
American men's basketball players
Basketball players from Florida
BC Oostende players
Beşiktaş men's basketball players
BK Ventspils players
Giessen 46ers players
Guaiqueríes de Margarita players
Ikaros B.C. players
Ilysiakos B.C. players
Ironi Ashkelon players
JDA Dijon Basket players
Jordanian men's basketball players
Jordanian people of African-American descent
KK Krka players
Pallacanestro Pavia players
Pallacanestro Reggiana players
Peñarol de Mar del Plata basketball players
Petrochimi Bandar Imam BC players
Quimsa basketball players
São José Basketball players
Shooting guards
Small forwards
South Florida Bulls men's basketball players